The Crealdé School of Art is a non-profit arts organization in Winter Park, Florida. Opened in 1975, the school offers visual and three-dimensional arts classes for all ages, a summer art camp, and a visiting artist workshop series.

Mission statement
Its mission is to stimulate the creative process inherent in each individual through hands-on visual-arts education and to cultivate a lifelong aesthetic appreciation in people of all ages and backgrounds. This mission is realized through comprehensive studio art instruction and interaction with professional working artists, presentation of gallery exhibitions and related art activities that encourage art exploration, an extensive outreach program that services at-risk minority youth and seniors, and fostering an appreciation for cultural diversity and the preservation of our cultural heritage.

Exhibits 
The school features two exhibition galleries and an outdoor sculpture garden that are open to the public at its main campus at 600 St. Andrews Boulevard. Exhibits include works by Florida artists, national and international artists, and the school's students.

Hannibal Square Heritage Center

Opened in 2007, Hannibal Square Heritage Center is a museum of African American art, history and heritage that was founded by the Crealdé School of Art in partnership with area residents and the City of Winter Park. It is located at 642 West New England Avenue. The Center features photos and oral histories, and changing exhibits of art, history and culture.

References

Website

Hannibal Square Heritage Center website

Buildings and structures in Winter Park, Florida
Education in Orange County, Florida
Art schools in Florida
Art museums and galleries in Florida
Tourist attractions in Orange County, Florida
Museums in Orange County, Florida
African-American museums in Florida
1975 establishments in Florida
Educational institutions established in 1975